The Ortstock is a mountain in the Schwyzer Alps, located at an elevation of  on the border between the cantons of Schwyz and Glarus. It overlooks Braunwald and Linthal on its east side, while the west side overlooks the high valley of Glattalp.

There are no glaciers surrounding the Ortstock, although a few névés can be found on its northern side. The north and south faces are very steep but experienced hikers can reach the summit via a trail on its less steep western flank.

The mountain lies in the municipalities of Muotathal, in the canton of Schwyz, and Glarus Süd, in the canton of Glarus.

References

External links

Ortstock on Hikr.org

Mountains of the Alps
Mountains of Switzerland
Mountains of the canton of Glarus
Mountains of the canton of Schwyz
Glarus–Schwyz border
Two-thousanders of Switzerland